Neon Future I is the second studio album by American DJ and producer Steve Aoki. It was released on September 30, 2014 through Ultra Records and Dim Mak Records. The second part of the album, Neon Future II was released on May 12, 2015.

Singles
The album was preceded by the release of eight singles. The first two singles, "Rage The Night Away" and "Delirious (Boneless)", were the only two to be given additional remixes before the album's release. Both tracks also feature in the original motion picture soundtrack of the 2014 film Step Up: All In. Other singles of the album are "Get Me Outta Here", "Neon Future", "Back to Earth" and "Born to Get Wild", was featured in the 2014 horror film The Hive.

Commercial performance
The album debuted at No. 1 on Dance/Electronic Albums, and No. 32 on Billboard 200, selling 10,000 copies in its first week. It has sold 27,000 copies in the US as of May 2015.

Track listing

Credits and personnel

 Steve Aoki – producer

Technical production
 Dave Kutch – mastering
 Erik Madrid – mixing
 Vincent Vu – mixing assistant

Additional musicians
 Ray Kurzweil – spoken word in "Transcendence"
 Aubrey de Grey – spoken word in "Beyond Boundaries"
 Patrick Stump – vocals and guitars in "Back to Earth"
 Pete Wentz – guitars in "Back to Earth"
 Joseph Harrison Sikora – additional vocals in "Rage the Night Away"

Other personnel
 Brian Roettinger – art direction, design
 Brian Ziff – photography

Chart history

Certifications

Release history

References

2014 albums
Steve Aoki albums
Electronic dance music albums by American artists